Kempton is both an English surname and a given name. Notable people with the name include:

Surname:
Adam Kempton (born 1957) Australian politician
Arthur Kempton (1889–1958), English footballer
David Kempton (born 1956), Australian politician
George Kempton (1871–1945), Australian politician
Gloria Kempton (1951–1991) American author
Greta Kempton (1901–1991) Austrian-born American artist
Jenny Twitchell Kempton (1835–1921), American classical contralto
Murray Kempton (1917–1997) American journalist
Tim Kempton (born 1964) American professional basketball player

Given name:
Kempton Bunton (1900–1976) British disabled pensioner who allegedly stole a Francisco Goya painting
Kempton Greene (1890–1966) American silent film actor

Fictional characters:
Dane Kempton, elderly poet in the 1903 novel The Kempton-Wace Letters by Jack London and Anna Strunsky
Jack Kempton, fictional character in Best Friends Together